Tippecanoe is an unincorporated community and census-designated place (CDP) in central Washington Township, Harrison County, Ohio, United States. It is located along State Route 800 in the valley of Stillwater Creek, a north-flowing tributary of the Tuscarawas River. it had a post office until 2011 with the ZIP code 44699. The population was 121 at the 2010 census.

History
Tippecanoe was platted in 1840. The community derives its name from the county namesake General William Henry Harrison's nickname, Tippecanoe, which, in turn, was derived from his heroism at the Battle of Tippecanoe, November 7, 1811. A post office was established at Tippecanoe in 1841, and remained in operation until it was discontinued in 2011.

Geography
Tippecanoe is less than one mile west of Clendening Dam, the outlet of Clendening Lake.

Demographics

References

Census-designated places in Ohio
Populated places in Harrison County, Ohio